The Heaven and Hell 2007 Tour was a global concert tour by Heaven & Hell in support of Black Sabbath's The Dio Years compilation CD.

History

The idea for a 2007 Heaven & Hell concert tour was brought about when Rhino records informed Tony Iommi's management that they would like to include previously unreleased material for the Dio Years compilation. After it emerged that no suitable material was available, Iommi contacted Dio and suggested they record some new songs together. After the successful recording sessions, the band decided to tour.

Sample set list

The following is the set list from Heaven & Hell's concert at Air Canada Centre in Toronto on 22 March 2007.

"E5150"
"After All (The Dead)"
"The Mob Rules"
"Children of the Sea"
"Lady Evil"
"The Sign of the Southern Cross"
"Voodoo"
"The Devil Cried"
"Computer God"
"Falling Off the Edge of the World"
"Shadow of the Wind"
"Die Young"
"Heaven and Hell"
"Neon Knights"

"Ear in the Wall" was played in some gigs.

Opening acts

Heaven & Hell had various support acts. In the US Queensrÿche and Alice Cooper after Rob Zombie - who had been confirmed as a US opener - was replaced by Cooper., though Alice Cooper was not actually an opening act, his Psycho-Drama tour dates were juxtaposed with theirs.
Lamb of God and Iced Earth were the supports at UK concerts. Canadian dates were supported by Megadeth and Down. During the Australian tour, the band Down led by ex Pantera lead singer Phil Anselmo were the supporting act. In May, Albany NY, Megadeth opened.

Tour DVD
Live from Radio City Music Hall was recorded on 30 March 2007. The show was the first American show the line-up performed in 15 years.

Tour dates

References

External links

2007 concert tours
Heaven & Hell (band) concert tours